Pomacea poeyana is a species of large freshwater snail with gills and an operculum, an aquatic gastropod mollusk in the family Ampullariidae, the apple snails.

Distribution 
Pomacea poeyana is endemic to Cuba, where it is well distributed.

References 

poeyana
Gastropods described in 1927
Endemic fauna of Cuba